Renato Janine Ribeiro is a Brazilian full professor of ethics and political philosophy at the University of São Paulo. As of April 6, 2015, he was named Minister of Education of Brazil in the cabinet of Dilma Rousseff.

References

|-

1949 births
Living people
People from Araçatuba
Brazilian philosophers
Academic staff of the University of São Paulo
Commanders of the National Order of Scientific Merit (Brazil)
Hobbes scholars
Education Ministers of Brazil